Tubmill Branch is a  long 2nd order tributary to the Swan Creek in Kent County, Delaware.  This stream is one of two that are named Tubmill Branch in the United States.  The other is in Caroline County, Maryland.

Course
Tubmill Branch rises on the Lednum Branch divide about 0.5 miles south of Lynch Heights, Delaware.  Tubmill Branch then flows northeast then southeast to meet Swan Creek at Hall Estates, Delaware.

Watershed
Tubmill Branch drains  of area, receives about 45.7 in/year of precipitation, has a topographic wetness index of 552.59 and is about 8.3% forested.

See also
List of Delaware rivers

Maps

References

Rivers of Delaware
Rivers of Kent County, Delaware